Troy Johnson may refer to:

Troy Johnson (cricketer), New Zealand cricketer
Troy Johnson (footballer), former Australian rules footballer
Troy Johnson (singer), American gospel and soul singer
Troy Johnson (wide receiver), football wide receiver
Troy Johnson (writer), food critic and writer